Tennis events were contested at the 1959 Summer Universiade in Turin, Italy.

Medal summary

Medal table

See also
 Tennis at the Summer Universiade

External links
World University Games Tennis on HickokSports.com (Archived1)
World University Games Tennis on HickokSports.com (Archived2)

1959
Universiade
1959 Summer Universiade